Holoholo may refer to:

 Holoholo people, an ethnic group in the Democratic Republic of the Congo
 Holoholo language, their language
 MV Holoholo, a Hawaiian research vessel